Hema Sankalia (1934–2015) was one of the first female architects in India.

Life

Early life 
Sankalia was born in Sialkot, India (now part of Pakistan) in 1934 to a Maharashtrian Brahmin family. Her father worked in Indian Administrtive Services, educated in England, but died in 1935 when Sankalia was a year old. Her mother Rama Bakhle, a writer who graduated from Karve University, then moved the family to Mumbai to be with her uncle who was an artist and general manager of Western Railways. In 1951, at the age of 16, Sankalia joined Sir J. J. School of Art with only two other girls in her class (Rashmi Daftari and Chandramani Gandhi).   After three years of schooling,   she wanted to study abroad to expand her education, but lost the support of higher education from her uncle.

Work life 
Sankalia began working and teaching modern architecture at the new Academy of Architecture, giving her the education she felt she missed from school. She credits Vina Mody as a guru in the field, who hired Sankalia to work in construction sites alongside masons, carpenters, and electricians. Along side Mody she gives Pravina Meghta credit on massively inspiring her creativity within architecture, later becoming one of the first female work partners in the country.

In 1957 she married Shireesh Sankalia, a 'pavement dweller' engineer, Until his death in 1984, he consistently supported Sankalia's career path.

Sankalia and Mody went on to form (Contemporary Arts and Crafts),   to create household products and educate the Indian artisan and consumer about the modern world. As an innovation, they displayed the products in the store as if they were already in the home or office. She worked at CAC until 2005 where she retired and passed it on to her son. The store still exists today in Mumbai and Pune.

Her commissions over time outside of household appliances included houses, women's hostels, printing presses, hospitals, research centers, governmental offices, and educational institutions. She took part   in forming the designs for the states EPCO (Environmental Planning and Coordination Organization) between 1987 and 1988, designed as  part ashram and part modern edifice.  .

In 1985 Sankalia formed the Research Unit for Practice (RUP) with Subodh Dhairyawan. This was a multidisciplinary practice focusing in product design, architecture, and urban/environmental planning. This would produce several housing clusters for low income groups, as well as middle and upper classes.

References 

1934 births
2015 deaths
People from Sialkot